Glamanand Supermodel India 2018 was the fourth edition of the Glamanand Supermodel India pageant. It concluded on 17 September 2018 at the Kingdom of Dreams in Gurugram, Delhi, India. At the conclusion of the event, 19 year old Tanishqa Bhosale from Pune was crowned Glamanand Miss India International 2018 by outgoing titleholder Ankita Kumari and represented India at the Miss International 2018 pageant that took place in Japan.

Apart from Bhosale, 19-year-old Simran Sharma from Jaipur was crowned Glamanand Miss Multinational India 2018 and represented India at Miss Multinational 2018 beauty pageant in New Delhi India.

26 year old Devika Vaid from Delhi was crowned Glamanand Miss India Earth 2018 by outgoing titleholder Shaan Suhas Kumar (Miss Earth India 2017). Shweta Parmar and Simran Sharma were adjudged first and second runners up, respectively. Devika Vaid was supposed to represent India at Miss Earth 2018, but 10 days prior to the international pageant, she suffered a leg injury. Nishi Baradwaj, 23-year-old model and semifinalist of Glamanand Supermodel India 2018, was named as her replacement. Deepshika, too was replaced by Simran Sharma for Miss Multinational 2018.

Results

Special awards

Contestants

References

External links
Glamanand Supermodel India website

Beauty pageants in India
Miss Earth
2018 beauty pageants
Miss International